Áron Márton (28 August 1896 – 29 September 1980) was an ethnic Hungarian Roman Catholic prelate who served as the Bishop of Alba Iulia from his appointment in late 1938 until his resignation in 1980. Márton held the title of Archbishop after he was raised to the honor despite leading a simple bishopric. He served as a prelate during a tumultuous period that included World War II and the emergence of a communist regime in Romania. He was even meant to become a cardinal but refused the honor when he learnt that another Romanian prelate would not be elevated into the cardinalate with him.

The organization Yad Vashem honored him on 27 December 1999 as a "Righteous Among the Nations" for his efforts to stop the deportation of Romanian and Hungarian Jews during the course of World War II.

Márton's cause for canonization opened on 17 November 1992 under Pope John Paul II and he is titled as a Servant of God.

Life

Education and conscription
Áron Márton was born to ethnic Hungarian peasant parents in  Csíkszentdomokos, Austro-Hungary on 28 August 1896 to Ágoston Márton and Julianna Kurkó.

His initial studies were overseen in his village from 1903 to 1906 before moving to a Roman Catholic school at Csíksomlyó  from 1907 until 1911. He was at another school from 1911 to 1914 before moving to a high school at Gyulafehérvár (now Alba Iulia, Romania). He graduated from high school in 1915 and was soon after drafted into the Austro-Hungarian armed forces that 15 June. He was involved in battles of World War I as a lieutenant (in the 82nd Infantry Regiment) in different conflict zones and was injured several times (first at Doberdo and then at Oituz and Asiago). The conclusion of the war saw him find work as a farmer and was also a metal worker in Brassó (now Braşov, Romania) from 1918 to 1920.

Priesthood

In 1920 he commenced his theological studies in Alba Iulia and soon after became a chaplain at Ditrău (July 1924 - 1 July 1925) once he received his ordination to the priesthood in 1924 (in Alba Iulia) from Bishop Gusztáv Károly Majláth. Márton was then made a chaplain at Gheorgheni on 1 July 1925 until being made a professor of religion in that town from 1926 to 1928. He later became a professor of theological studies in a range of different localities and he taught at a high school from 1928 to 1929 in Mureş. Márton served as a priest at Turnu Roşu from 1 July 1929 to 1 October 1930. He was also a court chaplain and an archivist for the Diocese of Alba Iulia after 1930 before serving as a priest at the Cluj college. On 15 March 1936 he was made the brief administrator of Saint Michael's parish in Cluj before being made its actual pastor on 14 August 1938.

Episcopate

During fascist rule
On 24 December 1938 he was appointed as the Bishop of Alba Iulia in a decree that Pope Pius XI signed. He received his episcopal consecration in 1939 just after that pope's death from Andrea Cassulo before he was enthroned in his new episcopal see. Márton was one of the first intellectuals to oppose the preparations for World War II in public and he had started this in 1938 prior to his appointment as a bishop. He remained in the southern part of Transylvania, which remained part of Romania following the Second Vienna Award in 1940, unlike the northern part, which became part of Hungary. In a speech he gave in Saint Michael's Church - during a visit to Kolozsvár on 18 May 1944 (for the ordination of three new priests) - he condemned the prepared deportation of the Romanian and Hungarian Jews. That week on 22 May he also wrote letters to the Hungarian government as well as to the local police and other authorities requesting the prohibition of the deportation. But the response to his pleas was his expulsion from Alba Iulia.

During communist rule
In 1945 - after the death of Cardinal Jusztinián Serédi - Pope Pius XII wanted Márton to become the next cardinal for the Hungarian nation, therefore leading Serédi's vacant see. But the opposition of the Hungarian Communists saw another prelate chosen for the position.

Márton continued to be a strong advocate for religious freedom and human rights which made him an opponent of the Romanian Communists and of the dictatorial regime that it had established in late 1947. The bishop was arrested on 21 June 1949 and was sentenced to life imprisonment in mid-1951; but in 1953 - with the change of the political climate in Romania - the circumstances of his imprisonment became more bearable. Pius XII in 1949 (while Márton was jailed) even elevated him to the rank of archbishop "ad personam". He was moved into a villa in the outskirts of Bucharest but was not allowed to have contact with the outside world. He was released in 1955.

Márton decided to revisit his bishopric after his release where he received a grand welcome on the part of an enthusiastic crowd. This proved embarrassing for the authorities and he was confined to house arrest following this. Márton was not allowed to leave the bishopric building for the decade and was permitted to emerge later in 1967. He was released as a result of negotiations that Cardinal Franz König had conducted in Bucharest. But Márton was still cautious of possible harassment from the authorities and volunteers often accompanied him on his pastoral visitations to ensure he was safe and left alone. He served as the President of the Romanian Episcopal Conference from 1970 to 1980. In 1972 he was diagnosed with cancer. He travelled several times to Rome where he met with Pope Paul VI.

Death
Márton submitted his resignation from his diocese to Pope John Paul II and the resignation was later accepted on 2 April 1980. He died not long after this on 29 September and was interred in the diocesan cathedral. During his battle with cancer he had never taken painkillers and continued with his work with great resilience. He was granted the posthumous title "Righteous Among the Nations" from Yad Vashem in Israel on 27 December 1999 for his activities in defending the Jews during the war.

Cardinalate nomination
On 22 February 1969 a private audience was held between Pope Paul VI and Monsignor Hieronymus Menges. The latter asked the pope to do something that would encourage the Romanian faithful and the pope asked: "what"? in response to what he could do. Menges recommended that the pope create both Márton and Iuliu Hossu as cardinals as well as name several priests as monsignors.

Paul VI agreed and tasked the then-Archbishop Agostino Casaroli with seeing whether it would be acceptable to the Romanian government. Casaroli dispatched his aide to meet with the Minister for Culture in Bucharest to ask if the double appointment would be welcomed. The Minister assured the aide that Márton's appointment would be acceptable to them but that Hossu was an unacceptable choice. Márton himself learnt that he was to be made a cardinal but refused upon learning that the government had denied Hossu. But the pope circumvented the government: he named Hossu a cardinal "in pectore" and never made Márton a cardinal. Hossu's secret appointment was not made public until the pope did so on 5 March 1973 after Hossu's 1970 death.

Beatification process
The beatification cause commenced on 17 November 1992 under Pope John Paul II after the Congregation for the Causes of Saints issued the official "nihil obstat" and titled Márton as a Servant of God. The diocesan phase of the investigation was opened in Alba Iulia on 26 July 1994 and was later closed on 5 December 1996. The documentation was forwarded to the C.C.S. in Rome who validated the process on 23 October 1998.

The Positio was delivered for evaluation to the C.C.S. in 2003 and theologians approved the cause on 25 June 2010.

The second and current (since 2012) postulator for this cause is Monsignor Kovács Gergely.

See also
 Holocaust in Hungary

References

External links

 
 Áron Márton official site 
 Statue 
 Hagiography Circle
 Catholic Hierarchy

1896 births
1980 deaths
20th-century venerated Christians
20th-century Roman Catholic archbishops in Romania
Austro-Hungarian military personnel of World War I
Burials at St. Michael's Cathedral, Alba Iulia
People from Harghita County
People detained by the Securitate
Romanian people of World War II
Romanian Righteous Among the Nations
Romanian anti-communist clergy
Romanian prisoners sentenced to life imprisonment
Romanian human rights activists
Romanian academics
Romanian religious leaders of Hungarian descent
Romanian theologians
Roman Catholic Archdiocese of Alba Iulia
Székely people
Venerated Catholics
Catholic Righteous Among the Nations